The 1998 Asian Junior Badminton Championships is an Asia continental junior championships to crown the best U-19 badminton players across Asia. This tournament were held at the Kuala Lumpur Badminton Stadium, in Kuala Lumpur, Malaysia from 15-21 June 1998.

Medalists 
China boys' and girls' team sweep the title after beat Malaysia 3–2 and South Korea 5–0 respectively. The Indonesian and Taiwanese boys' and girls' finished in third place. In the individuals event, Chien Yu-hsiu surprised the competition when he captured the boys' singles gold. China led by top-seed Zhang Yi, Indonesia, Korea and Malaysia were among the favourites to go home with the coveted title. In the girls' singles, China dominated event from the quarterfinals. Hu Ting won the girls' singles title after beat her teammate Gong Ruina, 11–6 and 11–2, but Gong who was partnered with Huang Sui won the girls' doubles title after defeat the Korean pair Lee Hyo-jung and Jun Woul-sihk, 15–13 and 15–8. Huang completes her success by winning her second title in the mixed doubles event with Jiang Shan. The boys' doubles gold goes to Chan Chong Ming and Teo Kok Seng of Malaysia.

Results

Semifinals

Finals

Medal table

References

External links 
 １９９８年アジアジュニアバドミントン選手権大会

Badminton Asia Junior Championships
Asian Junior Badminton Championships
Asian Junior Badminton Championships
International sports competitions hosted by Malaysia
1998 in youth sport